Arthog is a village, post town and community in the Meirionnydd area in Gwynedd, north Wales including the villages of Fairbourne and Friog.

Etymology
The village was named after the Welsh ruler Arthog ap Ceredig

History
In 1894, Solomon Andrews, a Cardiff entrepreneur, bought land overlooking the Mawddach estuary.  On the site he completed Mawddach Crescent in 1902. The row of terraced properties was the start of a purpose-built holiday resort he intended for the area. However the planned development went no further because the surrounding land proved unsuitable for urban planning. During the Second World War, the Royal Marines commandeered Mawddach Crescent. It became known as Iceland Camp. The marines also built huts on nearby Fegla Fawr, the foundation bases can still be seen between the trees above the estuary.

It is well known for its outdoor activity centres and the nearby Llynnau Cregennen. The Arthog Outdoor Education Centre is owned by Telford and Wrekin Council and is primarily used in term-time by schools from the Shropshire and Telford & Wrekin Local Education Authorities.

Population
According to the 2011 census, 28.3% of the community's residents were able to speak Welsh. Consequently, Arthog had the lowest percentage of Welsh speakers of any community in Gwynedd. 70.6% of the community's residents were born outside Wales.

Transport
The village was served by Arthog railway station (on the Barmouth - Ruabon line) until the complete closure of the line in 1964. The line is now a footpath known as the Mawddach Trail, and is popular with both walkers and cyclists.
Morfa Mawddach railway station is on the western outskirts of the village.

References

External links 

www.geograph.co.uk : photos of Arthog and surrounding area